Lieutenant-General Jacobus Verster  (1919–1981) was a South African military commander.  He joined the South African Air Force in 1936, and served in World War II.  He was Chief of the Air Force from 1967 to 1975.

Military career 
He was educated at al Rodean High School in Swartruggens and later Pretoria University and joined the Air Force in 1936 as a student pilot.

He served in RAF Bomber Command at Hendon in World War II. He was shot down in North Africa in 1942 and was taken prisoner.

He served as Aide-de-Camp to the Governor General and the State President (19531962) OC SAAF College 1961-1963. He was promoted to brigadier in 1963 and served as Military, Air and Naval Attaché to London from 1963-1966. As a major general he was appointed as GOC Air Defence Group during January to November 1967. Chief of the Air Force from December 1967 until early retirement in 1974. He died in 1981.

Awards and decorations 
 
 
 
 
 
 

|-

See also
List of South African military chiefs
South African Air Force

References

1919 births
1981 deaths
Afrikaner people
People from Boksburg
Chiefs of the South African Air Force